Sam Speed may refer to:

 Sam Speed, a book by Batem
 Sam Speed, a character from Sonic X; see List of Sonic X episodes
 Sam Speed, a character from The Catherine Tate Show; see List of The Catherine Tate Show characters and sketches

See also
 Samuel Speed, the last British convict sentenced to transportation; see Convicts in Australia